"About You" is a single by Irish singer-songwriter Shane Filan, released as the second single from his debut studio album You and Me (2013). The single was released on 3 November 2013 in Ireland and 25 August 2013 worldwide. The song was written by Shane Filan, Steve Mac and Wayne Hector

Music video
A music video to accompany the release of "About You" was first released onto YouTube on 6 October 2013 at a total length of four minutes and twelve seconds. It was credited under Parlophone Records.

Track listing

Chart performance

Release history

References

2013 songs
2013 singles
Shane Filan songs
Songs written by Wayne Hector
Songs written by Shane Filan
Songs written by Steve Mac
Capitol Records singles
Parlophone singles